The Austral Wheel Race is the oldest track bicycle race in  the world still existing, stretching back to 1887. It is owned and run by AusCycling Victoria. The Austral race is Australia’s greatest track cycling event. It is held in Melbourne, riders assigned handicaps according to ability over a series of heats. The finals are run over 2000m.

The races in 2004 and 2005 were at Vodafone Arena in February. The first race in 1887 held at Melbourne Cricket Ground over 3 miles (4800m), with first prize of a grand piano valued at 200 pounds. Other venues in Melbourne to host the race include the Exhibition Track, the North Essendon board track, the Olympic Park Velodrome and the Brunswick, Coburg and Northcote velodromes.

Malvern Star, a brand in bicycles in Australia, had its origins in the race. In December 1898 a young bicycle mechanic and professional cyclist, Tom Finnigan, won from a handicap of  holding off backmarkers with a foot to spare. The prize of 240 sovereigns let him establish a suburban bicycle shop, Malvern Star Cycles, which became a household name under Bruce Small.

Corruption tinged the event in 1901 when the American, "Plugger" Bill Martin, won from scratch, to allegations of fixing by John Wren. According to The Age in 1903 referring to 1902 "one of the judges appointed to officiate at the Austral Wheel meeting was called upon to resign, because he had a monetary interest in the result of the Austral Wheel Race."

In December 2019 Kelland O'Brien won from scratch in a time of 1min 58.44 sec, an average of 60.81 km/h at Hisense Arena.

Prize money
Prize money has varied, following the fashion for cycling, from a grand piano to monetary prizes of 240 sovereigns in 1898, 450 sovereigns in 1902, to a low of $1500 during the 1970s, increasing to $5,000 in 1982, and now exceeding $18,000 since 2000.

Past winners

Past competitors include distinguished Australian and international  cyclists, including Gordon Johnson, Steele Bishop, Sid Patterson, Russell Mockridge, Danny Clarke, Brett Aitken, Gary Neiwand and Shane Kelly. The record for the most wins belongs to Victorian Stephen Pate with four victories: in 1988 from scratch, in 1991 from minus 10m, in 1993 from minus 20m and 1999 from scratch.

In 2000, Neiwand was handicapped on 70m for the millennium edition and won comfortably.

Venues

Notes

References

External links 
 
 Austral Wheel Race history

Cycle racing in Australia
Cycling in Melbourne
Recurring events established in 1887
Cycling events in Victoria